The Groapa is a left tributary of the river Barcău in Romania. It discharges into the Barcău in Zăuan.

References

Rivers of Romania
Rivers of Sălaj County